The Honda 1300 is an automobile which was produced by Japanese manufacturer Honda from 1969 to 1972. The largest car ever manufactured by the company to that point, the front wheel drive 1300 was released as a sedan and coupé intended to compete primarily against Japanese automotive stalwarts such as the Toyota Corona, Mazda Capella, Mitsubishi Galant, and Nissan Bluebird. An ambitious project spearheaded by Soichiro Honda, it was plagued by engineering delays and high price compared to its competition. However, lessons learned from it would lead to the successful debut of the Civic in 1972 and the 1300's successor, the Honda Accord, in 1976.

History
During development frequent changes, sometimes made on a daily basis, hampered production. Mr. Honda was adamant the engine needed to be air rather than water cooled, arguing that "since water-cooled engines eventually use air to cool the water, we can implement air cooling from the very beginning."

In May 1969 final specifications and prices for the Japanese market were announced. There were originally two engine versions, being the "Series 77" with a single carburetor  engine and the "Series 99" with a four carburetors  unit: the less powerful car was listed with four levels of trim offered, of which the top three were also available with the four carburetor engine. The manufacturer's ex-works prices ranged from ¥488,000 for the entry level "Series 77" standard saloon to ¥710,000 for the "Series 99" Custom saloon. Automatic transmission and air-conditioning were optional. Six of the seven versions offered were priced comfortably above the less powerful Toyota Corolla 4-door deluxe, then retailing at ¥520,000: for this price Toyota included delivery to the Tokyo area.

The car had been introduced at the Tokyo Motor Show in October 1968, but production only got under way during the early months of 1969. In May 1969 the Honda 1300 went on sale in Japan. It was reported at the time that launch was delayed by a couple of months because company president Soichiro Honda found the styling of the car as presented at the Tokyo Motor Show the previous year unacceptably bland and called for a redesign. It was not lost on contemporary commentators that Honda himself at the time owned and frequently drove a Pontiac Firebird, and the split air intakes on the front of the Honda 1300 as it came to market suggest that Honda design personnel were also aware of the boss's fondness for his Pontiac.

Despite enthusiastic imprecations from Honda's US dealers the Honda 1300 was not sold in the US. Nor is there evidence of any sustained effort to sell it into Europe. Surviving examples appear mostly to be located in countries bordering the Pacific Ocean. In European terms, the car's engine size and dimensions would have placed it in the competitive sector of small 1300 cc family sedans, although its  width, reported to have been selected in order to qualify for the lower tax class on the domestic (Japanese) market, was significantly below the European standard represented by cars such as the Ford Escort of the time. The 1.3 litre engine displacement also gave Japanese buyers tax savings when the annual road tax was due over competitors with larger engines.

The two-door coupé bodystyle, with a longer and sportier looking front end, was added to the lineup in February 1970. The same two engines (95 and 110 PS) were on offer, marketed as the Coupé 7 and the Coupé 9.

The engine

The engine was SOHC air-cooled, with a fan attached to the flywheel to pull cool air through the engine block, labeled DDAC, or Duo Dyna Air Cooling. This warm air, and additional hot air from around the exhaust manifold, was then used to heat the passenger compartment, a novel approach which was not commonly used afterward. Hideo Sugiura, then the head of the R&D Center, looked back upon the sentiment of the time:
"We had a powerful company founder, Mr. Honda, who was on top of the engineering operation. He also had expertise, which he had acquired through a string of enormous successes. Having such a leader, the sentiment in the company was that we had to see it all the way through, regardless of where the road might take us. There was to be no surrender. We could not give up halfway."

"Streamlining the bulky construction of the air-cooled engine, and giving it the quietness of a water-cooled engine, will create the ideal power plant...." With that concept in mind, the research engineers worked tirelessly to achieve their ideal. It was from this grueling process of trial and error that the DDAC integrated dual air-cooled engine was achieved. The initial prototype was completed in July 1968, after which dynamic performance testing, temperature measurements and other basic evaluations were conducted.

In a departure from the previous Honda practice of using roller bearings on the crankshaft, the 1300 engine had more conventional plain bearings. Two versions of the engine were available. The engine fitted to the 77 sedan and Coupé 7 had a single Keihin carburetor and developed , while the engine that powered the 99 sedan and Coupé 9 was equipped with four Keihin carburetor and developed  at 7,300 rpm. 
Initial skepticism was expressed among competitor manufacturers and in the trade press concerning Honda's power output claims for the car, but those who drove it reported an engine that would freely rev to an indicated 8,000 rpm and remarkable performance for a 1,300 cc engined car: the factory figure at launch for a standing quarter-mile acceleration test of 17.2 seconds was felt to be not unreasonable. The engine was a dry-sump design with a pressurized oil system feeding from a tank.  An electrical fuel pump was another high-tech novelty which would eventually be common. The electrical system was another matter — it had a separate redundant set of wiring on each side of the car.

The high-revving character and dry-sump oil system both meant that the 1300's engine should be a natural for racing, and soon the RSC (Racing Service Club, Honda's competition department) built the mid-engined, tubular framed Honda R·1300. Weight was a mere . The car only made 29 laps (out of 120) before retiring, but continued to race with some modest success through the next year. The engine block was also used to create the 2991cc V8 used in the Honda RA302 that was raced at the  Formula One racing car produced by Honda Racing, and introduced by Honda Racing France during the 1968 Formula One season. The car was built based on the order by Soichiro Honda to develop an air-cooled Formula One engine.

DDAC
DDAC (Duo Dyna Air Cooling system: dynamic dual air cooling system), was the name of the air-cooling system presented by Honda in 1968. It had a double wall structure, thus, its name.

In this engine, the cooling "water jacket" was combined with the concept of air-cooled engine; the outer wall of the cylinder block is part of the structure in a two casting mold. It has the cooling air passage in the space where coolant would flow in a water-cooled engine. One fan forced cooling air through the passages, while another fan helped remove the heated air from the engine. Although an all-aluminum engine, this design did increase weight from the usual air-cooled design while benefiting from cross flow cooling.

Running gear
The car employed rack and pinion steering. At the front it had disc brakes, with drum brakes controlled via a dual-line hydraulic system at the rear. Suspension was independent, employing MacPherson struts at the front and an unusual combination of full-width swing axles and half-elliptic leaf springs at the rear. The front suspension was substantially modified after the car's initial presentation: production cars incorporated modified front suspension geometry, a lowered steering ratio and a steering damper, intended to reduce the unusually strong self-centring propensity which was a feature of the pre-production cars originally presented to journalists. The cars as sold also incorporated an updated gear-box and final drive ratios along with re-sized wheels.

Legacy
The H1300 provided the shock needed to change Honda's operating structure. Under the new system, Honda introduced the water-cooled Life and Civic models as its new mini automobile and small passenger cars. The Civic, which was equipped with a CVCC engine in full compliance with the Japanese government's Air Pollution Control Act, drew the world's attention to Honda's engineering approach.

Those involved in the H1300 project agreed unanimously. The pain indeed contributed much to the development of Honda's subsequent, successful future automobile models.

Honda 145

In 1972, the 1300 was succeeded by the technically interesting Honda 145, again offered as a sedan or a coupé. The 145's body was little changed from the 1300, but it was powered now by a water-cooled 1,433 cc engine with fuel injection instead of carburetors, the inspiration for the car's name. The market was not impressed by the 145: only 9,736 were produced as the model quickly found itself overshadowed by Honda's new Civic, and the 145 ended production in October 1974.

A coupé would not be produced again by Honda until 1978, when the Prelude was introduced.

Notes

References

 
 
 
 
 

1300
Cars introduced in 1969
Front-wheel-drive vehicles
Sedans